Gerrit Kinkel (born December 27, 1984 in Bregenz) is an Austrian composer, record producer, recording engineer and performer.

Musical career and personal life

Early life and education 
Gerrit grew up in the countryside of Vorarlberg, Austria.  At the age of four, he began to play trumpet.  
A principal in the Austrian Army Band, he entered the University of Music and Performing Arts in Vienna at the age of nineteen as a classical performer and Tonmeister.

In 2007 he was awarded an international scholarship from Berklee College of Music in Boston. There he continued his studies as a music producer and composer and graduated “summa cum laude.”

Current projects
Gerrit started his production company Gerrit Kinkel Productions in 2009.  The company specializes in composition and sound design for media and film well as music production and engineering.  Most recently Gerrit worked for American Idol and Cher. Gerrit also worked on an album for Glee star Matthew Morrison which was produced by Phil Ramone.

Gerrit Kinkel Productions has released a collection of original music and sound design titled "Trailer Suites and Toolkits - Volume 1", which is featured in various campaigns for upcoming films by Paramount Pictures, Summit Entertainment, Warner Brothers, Lions Gate and others.

Awards 

 4 Grammy nominations – Arturo Sandoval "Dear Diz - Everyday I Think Of You" - 2012
 Grammy Award for "Best Instrumental Album" – Arturo Sandoval "A Time For Love" - 2010
 Grammy nomination for "Best Engineered Album" – Arturo Sandoval "A Time For Love" -2010
 Grammy nomination for "Best Instrumental Pop Album" – Chris Botti "Live in Boston" - 2009
 NARAS Award – 2009
 Berklee International Scholarship – 2007

Notes

References 
http://www.gkprods.com
http://www.berklee.edu/news/2678/berklee-at-the-2010-latin-grammys
ftp://ftp.vienna.at/vntipps/galakonzert.doc
http://www.linkedin.com/pub/gerrit-kinkel/13/999/961
http://allmusic.com/artist/gerrit-kinkel-p1140490/credits
https://web.archive.org/web/20120108054138/http://rachelluttrell.com/

Living people
Austrian male composers
Austrian composers
1984 births